Welsh New Zealanders refers to New Zealand-born people who trace their ancestry back to Wales or Welsh people who emigrated to New Zealand and became naturalised citizens.

The Welsh, unlike other migrant groups from the British Isles, are not as numerous as their Welsh Australian counterparts. However, their contribution was notable. Most Welshmen who arrived in New Zealand were gold and coal miners.

Welsh place names in New Zealand 

Some of the Welsh-derived place names in New Zealand include:

Brynavon, Northland

Brynderwyn, Northland

Bryndwr, Christchurch

Cambrians, Otago - Named after the Welsh prospectors.

Cardiff, Taranaki - Named after Cardiff in Glamorganshire.

Carnarvon, now Himatangi

Hawarden, Canterbury - Named after Hawarden Castle in Flintshire.

Lake Pembroke, now Wanaka

Marchwiel, Canterbury - Named after Marchwiel in Denbighshire.

Milford Sound - Originally Milford Haven, it was named by the Welsh navigator John Grono after Milford Haven in Pembrokeshire.

Morgans Valley, Christchurch - Named after a Welsh settler.

Pembroke, Taranaki - Named after Pembroke in Pembrokeshire.

Picton, Marlborough - Named after Welsh General Sir Thomas Picton.

Welshmans Creek, Southland - Named after a Welsh prospector.

See also 

 European New Zealanders
 Europeans in Oceania
 Immigration to New Zealand
 Pākehā

References 

European New Zealander
Immigration to New Zealand

 
New Zealand